Badminton at the 2015 European Games in Baku took place from 22 to 28 June 2015 at Baku Sports Hall. The competition was held over a seven-day period and include five medal events in men’s and women’s singles, men’s and women’s doubles and mixed doubles. Approximately 160 athletes competed.

Qualification

32 quota places are available for each singles event, and 16 places (involving 32 players) are available for each pairs event.

The Badminton World Federation (BWF) ranking list of 26 March 2015 will be used for deciding eligibility for the event. There will be no separate qualification event.

The BWF ranking list on that date will be used to form a European ranking list by removing all players who are not qualified to represent any European NOC and this European ranking list will then be used to allocate places.

Singles players ranked 1 to 8 in the European ranking list for each singles event will be considered in turn and are eligible to enter, to a maximum of two per nation in each event. Singles players ranked 9 and lower in the European ranking list for each singles event will be considered in turn and are eligible to enter to a maximum of one per nation in that event. Therefore, for example, if an NOC has players ranked 1,4 and 7 in the European rankings, they will be eligible to enter two players; if they have players ranked 2 and 10, they will be eligible to enter one player.

Doubles pairs ranked 1 to 4 in the European ranking list for each doubles event will be considered in turn and are eligible to enter to a maximum of two pairs per nation in each event. Doubles pairs ranked 5 and lower in the European ranking list for each doubles event will be considered in turn and are eligible to enter one pair per nation in that event. Therefore, for example, if an NOC has pairs ranked 1 and 4 in the European rankings, they will be eligible to enter two pairs; if they have pairs ranked 3 and 12, they will be eligible to enter one pair.

Azerbaijan, as host, is entitled to enter two players; a maximum of one player/pair per event will be allowed. If additional Azeri players qualify under the regulations, they may also be entered. A number of 'universality' places will also be awarded to ensure a larger number of nations can compete in the event.

Medal table

Medalists

References

 
Badminton
2015 in badminton
Badminton in Azerbaijan
2015